Rosema is a settlement on the northwestern coast of São Tomé Island in São Tomé and Príncipe. It is an eastern subdivision of the town Neves, in the Lembá District. Its population is 2,587 (2012 census).

Population history

References

Populated places in Lembá District
Populated coastal places in São Tomé and Príncipe